Whispers and Moans is a 2007 Hong Kong film directed by Herman Yau. It is based on the 2006 book Whispers and Moans by Yeeshan Yang, investigating the Hong Kong sex trade. It has a Category III rating in Hong Kong.

Plot summary
Elsie (Yan Ng) is a social worker with an interest in the rights of sex workers, despite this she is naive as to the lives of prostitutes, and finds it impossible to be accepted into their milieu. This changes when she comes to the aid of nightclub hostess Happy (Chan Mei-hei). Happy introduces Elsie to her colleagues and Elsie is able to observe first hand the business of prostitution in Hong Kong.

At the top of the scale are those who become the long term mistresses of the wealthy, receiving a retainer and having their living expenses paid for, a step towards this being to be kept for a shorter term, for months or weeks. Nana (Mandy Chiang) and her sister Aida (Monie Tung) began their careers as underage prostitutes in an underground brothel, before graduating to become legal hostesses on turning 18. However Aida has become a drug addict and over a matter of days makes a descent that would normally occur over years. Those unable to leave the prostitute trade, as they grow older, work at small one woman brothels, with a much reduced rate for sex and a higher turnover of customers than that found at nightclubs. A very small number, such as Coco (Athena Chu), become mama-sans. However Aida's addiction is so great that she cannot work even as a brothel prostitute and instead becomes a street prostitute, normally the fate of much older women.

Also working the streets is the transgender Jo (Don Li) whose goal is to save up enough money for sex reassignment surgery, her boyfriend is Tony (Patrick Tang) who works as a male prostitute. One of Tony's customers is the mistress of a triad boss and the film ends with Tony's slaying.

Cast and roles
 Athena Chu – Coco
 Candice Yu – Jenny
 Mandy Chiang – Nana
 Monie Tung – Aida
 Yan Ng – Elsie, the social worker
 Don Li – Jo
 Patrick Tang – Tony
 Chan Mei-hei	
 Karen Tong
 Chik King-Man		
 Ken Lo	
 Cheung Chi-Kwong		
 Emotion Cheung	
 Cheung Wing-Hong		
 Wong Tak-bun	
 Wong Man-Wai		
 Sherming Yiu

Awards
Whispers and Moans received a "Film of Merit" award at the 2007 Hong Kong Film Critics Society Awards.

See also
 True Women For Sale, a 2008 Hong Kong film directed by Herman Yau

References

External links
 
 
 loveHKfilm entry

2007 films
Hong Kong drama films
Films about prostitution in Hong Kong
Films directed by Herman Yau
Films about trans women